Robert Ian Sitch (born 17 March 1962) is an Australian director, producer, screenwriter, actor and comedian.

Early life
Sitch was born in 1962, the son of Melbourne bus proprietor Charles (Charlie) Sitch. Sitch attended St Kevin's College and Melbourne Grammar and graduated with a Bachelor of Medicine and Surgery in 1987 from the University of Melbourne, where he resided at Trinity College. He worked at the Royal Women's Hospital in Melbourne, where he assisted in the deliveries of newborns. He practised medicine for a short time.

Career

Sitch is currently a member of the Working Dog production company which have produced the television shows Frontline, A River Somewhere, The Panel, Thank God You're Here and Utopia and the feature films The Castle, The Dish and Any Questions for Ben?. Sitch co-wrote and directed each of these films.

In 2006, to mark 50 years of television in Australia, the Nine Network special 50 Years 50 Stars listed Sitch at the 39th greatest living television star in Australia. Several of his programs, including The D-Generation and Frontline, were included in the earlier special, 50 Years 50 Shows, coming in at 50 and 22 respectively.

Sitch is also a co-author of the satirical Jetlag travel guides to Molvanîa, Phaic Tăn and San Sombrèro.

Filmography

Films

Television

Albums
 The D-Generation: The Satanic Sketches (1989)
 The D-Generation: The Breakfast Tapes (1990)

Personal life
Sitch is married to fellow Australian comedian Jane Kennedy. They have five children, including Joshua Sitch, who starred in ABC's Little Lunch. Sitch's brother Greg Sitch is an entertainment lawyer and producer who has worked with his brother on multiple projects including The Castle and Utopia.

References

External links
 
 Working Dog Productions

1962 births
Living people
People educated at St Kevin's College, Melbourne
People educated at Melbourne Grammar School
People educated at Trinity College (University of Melbourne)
Melbourne Medical School alumni
Australian obstetricians
Australian male comedians
Australian people of German descent
Australian male television actors
Australian film producers
Australian screenwriters
Film directors from Melbourne
Male actors from Melbourne
Australian television talk show hosts
Australian film studio executives